Frank McNulty (born February 2, 1973) is an attorney and former Speaker of the Colorado House of Representatives. McNulty was first elected in 2006 to represent Colorado House District 43. He was re-elected in 2008, 2010 and to his fourth and final term due to term-limits in 2012.

McNulty was elected by a unanimous vote to serve as the 56th Speaker when the Republican Party earned a majority of State House members after the 2010 elections.  He served as Speaker of the Colorado House of Representatives for the 68th General Assembly.

In 2022, McNulty was elected to the University of Colorado Board of Regents, representing the 4th district.

Biography
McNulty was born in Blue Island, Illinois on February 2, 1973. He was raised in the south metro area and educated at J. K. Mullen High School and the University of Colorado at Boulder. Following his graduation from CU, he accepted a position in the Washington, D.C. office of Congressman Wayne Allard.

McNulty returned to Colorado in 1998 to study law at the University of Denver College of Law, concentrating on natural resources and water law; he completed his J.D. degree in 2001 and belongs to the Douglas/Elbert Bar Association. During this time, he began his work at the state legislative level. Frank joined Governor Bill Owens' administration in 2000, serving as a division legislative liaison and as Assistant Director for Water for the Colorado Department of Natural Resources.  In this role, his efforts informed legislation deemed the most significant update to water policy in the past five decades .

In 2011, McNulty was elected Speaker of the Colorado House of Representatives, serving as Speaker for 68th General Assembly.

Legislative career

2006 Election
McNulty was elected to his first term in the Colorado General Assembly in 2006, defeating Democrat Allen A. Dreher with 61% of the votes cast during the general election.  The 2006 election was McNulty's first campaign for elected office.

2007 Legislative Session

McNulty served on the House Agriculture, Livestock & Natural Resources Committee, the House Transportation Committee and the House Appropriations Committee.

McNulty sponsored legislation to extend in-state tuition benefits to active duty military personnel on temporary assignment in Colorado and their families.  The measure was part of a package of veterans' benefit bills backed by a bipartisan coalition of legislators that were passed and signed into law. McNulty also sponsored a version of Jessica's Law, a Florida law named after a Jessica Lunsford who was brutally raped and murdered by a repeat sex offender. McNulty's bill to create mandatory minimum sentences for criminals convicted of violent sex assaults against children died in the House Judiciary Committee.

Other legislation introduced and passed by McNulty included a bill to make it easier for farmers and ranchers to temporarily donate their water to help protect the environment, especially during times of drought.

During the 2007-2008 legislative interim, McNulty served on the Transportation Legislation Review Committee.

2008 Legislative Session
McNulty again served on the House Agriculture, Livestock & Natural Resources Committee, the House Transportation Committee and the House Appropriations Committee.  He also served on a special committee appointed to review allegations of improper behavior by Rep. Douglas Bruce.  The committee recommended that Rep. Bruce be censured for his actions.  The censure resolution passed 62-1.

McNulty introduced legislation that eliminated antiquated rules for the submission of development plats, increased transparency in campaign contributions, increased a focus on the use and availability of hydroelectricity, required that those registering to vote show proof of citizenship first,  and made state funding available for Colorado National Guardsmen attending state colleges and universities.  He also addressed minimum bond requirements designed to keep drug dealers off the streets and pushed for divestment of state pension funds from companies doing business in Iran, a move which led to new rules governing Colorado's Public Employees Retirement Association investments.

2008 Election
In 2008, McNulty successfully secured a second term in the Colorado House of Representatives; earning 63% of the votes cast in the general election against the Democratic nominee, John Stevens. The Denver Post endorsed McNulty's 2008 re-election bid.

In October 2008, McNulty participated in the "Western Values Tour" with U.S. Senator Jon Kyl of Arizona.  The purpose of the tour was to promote the McCain-Palin presidential ticket in central Colorado.

2009 Legislative Session
McNulty served as ranking Republican on the House Agriculture, Livestock & Natural Resources Committee and served as a member of the House Transportation & Energy Committee and the Legislative Audit Committee.

In 2009, McNulty continued his efforts to make college available to members of America's military by eliminating the in-state tuition waiting period for military veterans  if they made their home in Colorado.  He initiated efforts to help protect children from coming into contact with felons while attending public schools and worked with Rep. Laura Bradford and Rep. Scott Tipton to resurrect Jessica's Law.  The bills prohibiting felons in schools and Jessica's Law died in Democratic-controlled committees.

After House Minority Leader Mike May of Parker announced his intention to retire in December 2008, McNulty was identified as a potential candidate for the vacated leadership post.  McNulty and David Balmer of Centennial both expressed interest in filling the pending leadership vacancy created by May's retirement.  The leadership vote and May's resignation were postponed after allegations surfaced that a lobbyist Erik Groves attempted to influence the election in favor of Rep. Balmer.  A special legislative panel investigated the allegations against Groves and Balmer for his involvement.  The panel cleared Rep. Balmer and recommended that Mr. Groves be admonished for his role.

2010 Legislative Session
McNulty served on the House Education Committee, the House Transportation & Energy Committee and the Legislative Audit Committee.

2010 Election
McNulty secured a third term in the Colorado House of Representatives in 2008, earning 67% of the votes cast in the general election against the Democratic nominee, Gary Semro. He was later elected unanimously as Speaker of the Colorado House of Representatives.

2012 Legislative Session
In 2012, Republicans in the state House, through a filibuster, killed a civil unions bill supported by Democrats as well as a handful Republicans. A special legislative session followed.

2012 Election
In the first election after legislative redistricting, McNulty won a fourth and final term in the Colorado House of Representatives in 2010, earning 62% of the votes cast in the general election against the Democratic nominee, Gary Semro.

The 2012 General Election also witnessed President Obama capture Colorado by 5.5 points over Republican Mitt Romney and the Democratic Party gained five seats in the House of Representatives, which gave them a majority.

2022 election
In the 2022 general election, McNulty defeated his Democratic Party opponent, winning 63.96% of the total votes cast.

References

External links
Campaign website
Colorado General Assembly profile

Living people
Members of the Colorado House of Representatives
Speakers of the Colorado House of Representatives
People from Highlands Ranch, Colorado
University of Colorado Boulder alumni
University of Denver alumni
21st-century American politicians
1973 births